Interdisciplinary Center for Organizational Architecture (ICOA) is a research center at Aarhus University, School of Business and Social Sciences in Aarhus, Denmark.

The Center for Organizational Architecture is a transdisciplinary partnership between research groups at Aarhus University, the Danish cross-ministerial innovation unit Mindlab and leading international researchers and institutions. The center works, in close dialogue with businesses and public organizations, with the design and redesign of organizations.

Staff
 Børge Obel - Centre Director
 Rick L. Edgeman - Professor 
 Jacob Kjær Eskildsen - Professor 
 Anders Frederiksen - Professor 
 René Franz Henschel - Professor 
 Anne Bøllingtoft - Associate Professor
 Dorthe Døjbak Håkonsson - Associate Professor
 Lars Bach - Assistant Professor
 Jacob Brix - Assistant Professor
 Panagiotis Mitkidis - Assistant Professor
 Dan Mønster - Assistant Professor
 Elena Shulzhenko - Postdoc

In addition to this several PhD students

Visiting Professors
 Richard M. Burton - Professor of Management and Organization at The Fuqua School of Business, Duke University
 Linda Argote - Professor of Organizational Behavior and Theory at Tepper School of Business, Carnegie Mellon University
 Charles Snow - Professor of Business Administration at Pennsylvania State University
 George Huber - Professor in Management at The University of Texas at Austin
 Fabian Lange - Assistant Professor of Economics at Department of Economics, Yale University

See also
 Organizational architecture

External links
ICOA Website
Aarhus School of Business and Social Sciences Website

Business models
Enterprise modelling